Velyki Berezhtsi is a village in Kremenets Raion, Ternopil Oblast, Ukraine. In 2001, the community had 1011 residents. It belongs to Kremenets urban hromada, one of the hromadas of Ukraine.  The postal code is 47020.

The village was first recorded in 1545.

Village remembers Kresowa księga sprawiedliwych on page 74.

References 

Villages in Kremenets Raion